Daniel Aaron Southwick (born September 28, 1981) is an American football quarterback, currently playing for the Columbus Lions in the National Arena League (NAL). He played college football at Brigham Young University, Dixie State College, Oregon State University, the University of Utah and Occidental.

Early life
Danny was born to Dan Southwick and Shawn (Southwick) King in Provo, Utah. He attended Timpview High School in Provo, where he lettered in football.

College career
Southwick originally signed with Brigham Young University out of high school, when he elected to take a two-year Mormon mission. Upon returning from his mission, Southwick enrolled at Oregon State University. Southwick then transferred to Dixie State College for a season. From Dixie State, Southwick transferred to the University of Utah, where he walked-on and was listed as the backup quarterback going into fall camp with the Utes. Southwick then went back to Dixie State. He played his senior season of college football at Occidental. Southwick's college statistics, excluding post-season play, include 271 completions out of 478 passes (57%) for 3,804 yards, and 29 touchdowns with 23 interceptions. As a starter in college, during the regular season, Southwick compiled a record of 13 wins and 5 losses.

Professional career

Louisville Fire 
Southwick began his professional career in 2008 signing with the Louisville Fire of the af2 as a street free agent. After finishing the season with the Fire, the franchise folded as well as the Arena Football League.

Oakland Raiders 
In 2009, Southwick signed with the Oakland Raiders, but was released prior to the preseason.

Dallas Vigilantes 
On February 25, 2011, Southwick was assigned to the Dallas Vigilantes, but he was placed on reassignment just 3 days later on February 28.

Tampa Bay Storm 
On May 16, 2011, he signed with the Tampa Bay Storm. On July 16, 2011, Southwick made his first career arena football start for the Storm, where he was eventually replaced by Matt Grothe due to his ineffective play.

Portland Thunder 
In April 2014, he was named the starting quarterback for the Portland Thunder.

Spokane Shock 
On April 7, 2015, Southwick was assigned to the Spokane Shock.

Los Angeles Kiss 
On May 13, 2015, Southwick was traded to the Los Angeles KISS for future considerations.

Portland Thunder (second stint) 
He was assigned to the Portland Thunder on February 1, 2016. The Thunder changed its name to the Portland Steel on February 24, 2016. He was placed on reassignment by the Steel on April 25, 2016.

Los Angeles Kiss (second stint) 
On May 26, 2016, Southwick was assigned to the Los Angeles KISS. On June 25, 2016, he was placed on reassignment.

Orlando Predators 
On July 6, 2016, he was assigned to the Orlando Predators.

Cleveland Gladiators 
On May 23, 2017, Southwick was assigned to the Cleveland Gladiators.

Massachusetts Pirates 
On April 19, 2018, he signed with the Massachusetts Pirates. He was released by the Pirates on April 25, 2018.

Jacksonville Sharks 
On April 26, 2018, he was claimed by the Jacksonville Sharks. The same day, he was also placed on refuse to report.

Philadelphia Soul 
On May 23, 2018, he was assigned to the Philadelphia Soul. On June 5, 2018, he was placed on reassignment.

Columbus Destroyers 
On April 17, 2019, Southwick was assigned to the Columbus Destroyers. He was placed on recallable reassignment on April 19, 2019.

Jersey Flight 
On December 11, 2019, Southwick signed with the Jersey Flight. The 2020 National Arena League season was canceled due to the COVID-19 pandemic. On August 24, 2020, Southwick re-signed with the Flight for the 2021 season. On June 17, 2021, the Flight cut Southwick from their roster.

Jacksonville Sharks (second stint) 
He signed with the Jacksonville Sharks four days later on June 21, 2021.

FCF Zappers 
In March 2022, Southwick would be drafted by the FCF Zappers in the first draft of the FCF.

Columbus Lions 
On May 13, 2022, Southwick signed with the Columbus Lions.

AFL statistics

Stats from ArenaFan:

Personal life
Southwick is the son of actress Shawn Southwick, and was the stepson of talk show host Larry King.

References

External links
Oregon State bio 
Utah Utes bio 
Occidental Tigers bio 
Official Website 
Oakland Raiders bio 
ArenaFan.com

1981 births
Living people
Sportspeople from Provo, Utah
Players of American football from Utah
American football quarterbacks
Utah Utes football players
Utah Tech Trailblazers football players
Occidental Tigers football players
Louisville Fire players
Oakland Raiders players
Dallas Vigilantes players
Tampa Bay Storm players
San Jose SaberCats players
San Antonio Talons players
Chicago Rush players
Cleveland Gladiators players
Portland Thunder players
Los Angeles Kiss players
Portland Steel players
Orlando Predators players
Massachusetts Pirates players
Jacksonville Sharks players
Philadelphia Soul players
Columbus Destroyers players